10,000 Nights Nowhere is a 2013 Spanish film written and directed by Ramón Salazar. The cast features Andrés Gertrúdix, Susi Sánchez, Lola Dueñas, Rut Santamaría, Najwa Nimri, Manuel Castillo and Paula Medina.

Plot 
An unnamed man (the 'Son') experiences three parallel lives in Madrid (with his dysfunctional family: his 'Mother' and 'Sister'), Paris (with a 'Friend') and Berlin (with a group of friends: Claudia, Ana and Leon).

Cast

Production 
Shooting took place over the course of three years.

Release 
The film premiered at the Seville European Film Festival in November 2013. It was theatrically released in Spain on 9 May 2014.

Reception 
Philipp Engel of Fotogramas rated the film 4 out of 5 stars, highlighting the editing pertaining the film's dreamlike structure, while citing certain lack of aesthetic simplicity and naturalness and some out-of-place character as a negative point.

As a bottom line, Jonathan Holland of The Hollywood Reporter underscored the film to be a "valuably ambitious fare which is swooningly lovely, intensely personal, evocative -- and inevitably somewhat pretentious".

Sergio F. Pinilla of Cinemanía also scored 4 out of 5 stars, writing that Ramón Salazar tells "the unique chronicle of a lost man", comparing the film to works by Terrence Malick and Julio Medem, also considering that the director manages to bring out the qualities of two of the best Spain's specialists in "trance films" (Nimri and Dueñas).

Accolades 

|-
| align = "center" rowspan = "4" | 2014 || 28th Goya Awards || Best Supporting Actress || Susi Sánchez ||  || align = "center" | 
|-
| rowspan = "3" | 23rd Actors and Actresses Union Awards || Best Film Actor in a Leading Role || Andrés Gertrúdix ||  || rowspan = "3" | 
|-
| Best Film Actress in a Leading Role || Susi Sánchez ||  
|-
| Best Film Actress in a Secondary Role || Lola Dueñas || 
|}

See also 
 List of Spanish films of 2014

References 

2013 drama films
Spanish drama films
2010s Spanish-language films
Films set in Madrid
Films set in Paris
Films set in Berlin